Jed Johnson (December 30, 1948 – July 17, 1996) was an American interior designer and film director. Initially hired by Andy Warhol to sweep floors at The Factory, he subsequently moved in with Warhol, and was his boyfriend for twelve years. As a passenger in the first class cabin, he was killed when TWA Flight 800 came down shortly after takeoff in 1996.

Early life 
Johnson and his twin brother Jay were born in Alexandria, Minnesota on December 30, 1948. They were two of six children raised in Arizona and then California, where the family moved in search of employment.

Warhol years
In 1967, Johnson and his brother Jay moved from Sacramento, California to New York City. They found an apartment in the East Village, Manhattan through a heroin addict, got mugged and lost their last $200. Two weeks later, Johnson delivered a telegram to the Decker building which was being renovated by Paul Morrissey before it became the new home of Andy Warhol's Factory. Johnson accepted an on-the-spot job offer to sweep floors, but quickly moved into editing several films including  L'Amour (1973), Andy Warhol's Dracula (1974), and eventually directing Andy Warhol's Bad (1977).

Johnson picked out a townhouse for Warhol on East 66th Street and designed its interiors. He lived there with Warhol for a number of years.

In 1982, architect Alan Wanzenberg and Jed opened their own company named Johnson and Wanzenberg and collaborated to create and design the houses of celebrities.

Johnson was later a member of the Andy Warhol Art Authentication Board, formed the year before his death.

Designer
Among other offshoot projects, Johnson designed the offices of Interview magazine. Through that work, he met Sandra and Peter Brant and worked with them on eleven projects. He built on this career, eventually forming a partnership in both business and life with the architect Alan Wanzenberg, and taking on clients such as Mick Jagger and Richard Gere.

He was named to the Interior Design Magazine Hall of Fame in 1996.

Death
On July 17, 1996, Johnson was a passenger on TWA Flight 800. He was killed along with 229 other passengers and crew members when the plane exploded off the coast of Long Island, New York. He was 47.

Bibliography
 Jay Johnson (author), with contributions by Paul Goldberger, Bob Colacello, Pierre Berge, and Sandra Brant. Jed Johnson: Opulent Restraint (New York: Rizzoli, November 2005). 
 Alan Wanzenberg. Journey: The Life and Times of an American Architect (New York: The Pointed Leaf Press, 2013).

References

External links
Jed Johnson Associates 
 

1948 births
1996 deaths
Accidental deaths in New York (state)
American interior designers
Film directors from Minnesota
LGBT people from Minnesota
People from Alexandria, Minnesota
Victims of aviation accidents or incidents in 1996
Victims of aviation accidents or incidents in the United States
People from Sacramento, California
People from the East Village, Manhattan
People associated with The Factory
American twins
American LGBT artists
LGBT film directors
TWA Flight 800